A list of films produced in Italy in 1944 (see 1944 in film):

References

External links
Italian films of 1944 at the Internet Movie Database

Italian
1944
Films